Alvijan (also Romanized as Alvījān) is a village in Bazarjan Rural District, in the Central District of Tafresh County, Markazi Province, Iran. At the 2006 census, its population was 122, in 41 families.

References 

Populated places in Tafresh County